St Trinity House is an historic series of four buildings in the English city of York, North Yorkshire. Grade II listed and forming the southern end of King's Square, parts of the structures date to the early 18th century, with alterations occurring over the next two hundred years. Their addresses today range from 3 to 4A King's Square. The Duke of York pub is at numbers 3 and 4; and the current use of 4A, the oldest building in the range, is not known, although people signed up for The Ghost Hunt of York are asked to meet beside it. The only rendered front of the four, it adjoins 1 The Shambles to form an L-shape at the southwestern corner of the square. In the early 20th century, both buildings were the home of G. Ackroyd Furniture Stores.

In 1430, the site was occupied by shops by the name of Le Mercery and by a building known as Hellekeld (the dark well). These were believed to be a precursor to Pump Court. 
 
Three of the buildings are 20th-century remodels of 15th-century (or earlier) structures, one of which was altered in the 17th century, while two were rebuilt in the early part of the 18th century. The other one is a 20th-century structure. Each 15th-century structure retains its timberframing. 
 
The first floor of 4A is jettied towards Newgate and retains its dragon beam on that corner. (The first building at what appears to be the beginning of Newgate is actuallly 5 and 6 King's Court.) 
 
The buildings were in the shadow of Holy Trinity Church (for which the building is named), which stood immediately to the north in what was then King's Court, between the 15th century and the church's demolition in 1937.

References 

 

18th-century establishments in England
Grade II listed buildings in York
18th century in York
19th century in York
20th century in York